Devhonte Johnson often referred to as “Bones” is a black belt Professional Jiu-Jitsu Competitor who heads the Unity Jiu Jitsu team. He specializes in the Lasso Guard and Stack Pass techniques. In 2019 Devhonte opened his own gym, Bones BJJ located in Clifton, NJ.

Career
Johnson began pursuing his career as a Jiu-Jitsu player in high school, initially under Coach Edson Carvalho who guided Johnson up to the purple belt. After becoming a white belt player, he decided to further advance his career as a professional player and began training to achieve his goals.

Eventually, in 2015, Johnson left the Carvalho team and joined the Unity Jiu Jitsu in New York City where he trained under coach Murilo Santana. During this time, Johnson became a professional Jiu-Jitsu player and began participating in local, state, and national level competitions.

Soon, Johnson also began his coaching career - taking a couple of classes at Unity HQ in Manhattan. Under popular demand in a few years, he opened his own Unity Jiu-Jitsu affiliate in New Jersey.

In 2018 Johnson participated in numerous competitions as a brown belt player and conquered multiple titles in the IBJJF World Jiu-Jitsu Championship, IBJJF World No-Gi Championship, IBJJF European Open Championship as well as the IBJJF Pans No-Gi Championship. Lastly, Johnson was awarded his black belt rank by coach Murilo Santana.

Fighting history

Awards and achievements
 1st Place IBJJF Pans No-Gi Championship (2014** blue)
 1st Place IBJJF World NoGi Championship (2014 blue)
 3rd Place IBJJF Pans Championship (2015 purple)
 1st Place IBJJF World NoGi Championship (2015 purple)
 3rd Place IBJJF World Championship NOGI (2015* purple)
 2nd Place IBJJF World Championship (2016 purple)
 1st Place IBJJF Pans No-Gi Championship (2016 purple)
 1st Place IBJJF Pans Championship (2016 purple)
 3rd Place IBJJF World Championship (2016* purple)
 1st Place IBJJF World NoGi Championship (2016 purple)
 1st Place IBJJF World Championship (2017 purple)
 1st Place IBJJF World NoGi Championship ( 2017 brown)
 1st Place IBJJF European Open (2017* purple)
 1st Place IBJJF Pans Championship (2017 purple)
 1st Place IBJJF American Nationals NOGI (2017** brown)
 1st Place IBJJF NY Summer Open (2017** brown)
 1st Place IBJJF NY Summer Open NOGI (2017** brown)
 2nd Place IBJJF European Open (2017 purple)
 1st Place IBJJF World Championship ( 2018 brown)
 1st Place IBJJF European Open (2018 brown)
 1st Place IBJJF Pans No-Gi Championship (2018** brown)
 2nd Place IBJJF European Open (2018 brown)
 2nd Place IBJJF Pans Championship (2018 brown)
 3rd Place CBJJ Brazilian Nationals (2018 brown)
 3rd Place IBJJF World Championship NOGI (2018)
 1st Place IBJJF New York Fall Open NOGI (2018)
 1st Place IBJJF European Open NOGI (2019)
 1st Place IBJJF Washington DC Open (2019)
 2nd Place IBJJF European Open NOGI (2019*)
 3rd Place IBJJF Pan Championship NOGI (2019**)
 3rd Place IBJJF Pan Championship (2020)
 1st Place IBJJF World Championship NOGI (2021)
 1st Place IBJJF Pan Championship NOGI (2021)
 1st Place IBJJF Hoston Open (2021)
 3rd Place IBJJF World Championship (2021)
 3rd Place IBJJF Pan Championship (2021)

References

Year of birth missing (living people)
Living people
American jujutsuka
People from Clifton, New Jersey